The Consiglio Universitario Nazionale (CUN; Italian for National University Council) is an elected body representing the various sectors of the Italian university system. It was established by law n. 18 of 26 January, 2006. The current president is Antonio Vicino, Full Professor in Automation engineering at the University of Siena.

The council is composed of a president and fifty-seven members. Forty-two are elected by the professors and researchers, eight by the National Council of University Students, three by the Conferenza dei Rettori delle Università Italiane (Conference of Rectors of the Italian Universities), three from the technical and administrative staff of the universities, one from among the deans of faculties and one from among the university administrative directors.

Sources 
This article originated as a partial translation of this version of :it:Consiglio Universitario Nazionale, its counterpart in the Italian Wikipedia.

External links 
Official website 

Education in Italy
College and university associations and consortia in Europe